Kutlehar Fort also known as Forts of Solasingi is a fort in Himachal Pradesh, India, built by Sansar Chandra, the ruler of Kangra. Maharaja Ranjit Singh renovated the fort in the year 1809. The fort is situated on Solasingi Dhar Range at 1162m altitude above sea level. The ceilings of the fort are made of huge stone slabs.

Nearby attractions 
 Kutlehar Forests
 Bhakhra Dam
 Raipur Palace
 Bilaspur
 Piplu

References 

Forts in Himachal Pradesh
Buildings and structures in Una district
Rajput architecture